The Silver City Cemetery, is a historic cemetery in the ghost town of Silver City, Utah, United States, that dates from the 1870s and is listed on the National Register of Historic Places (NRHP).

Description
The cemetery was deemed significant for its information potential and "as the only remaining evidence of Silver City, at one time (1870-1880s) the Tintic Mining District's center. Grave sites help to document the history of the peoples and cultures of the town."

It was listed on the NRHP March 14, 1979. The Sunbeam Mine and the Tintic Smelter Site, also legacies of Silver City, were also listed on the NRHP on the same day.

See also

 List of cemeteries in Utah
 National Register of Historic Places listings in Juab County, Utah

References

External links

Cemeteries in Utah
National Register of Historic Places in Juab County, Utah
Buildings and structures completed in 1875